C'est la vie may refer to:

 C'est la vie (phrase), a French phrase, translated as "That's life"

Books
 C'est la Vie (comic strip), an English-language comic strip by Jennifer Babcock
 C'est la Vie, a 2004 memoir by Suzy Gershman

Film, radio and TV
 C'est la vie (radio), a Canadian radio program
 C'est la Vie, a 1967 musical review airing as an episode of ABC Stage 67
 C'est la Vie, a 1981 French film directed by Paul Vecchiali
 La Baule-les-Pins, English title: C'est la vie (1990 film)
 C'est la Vie, a 2001 French film starring Sandrine Bonnaire
 C'est la vie, TV series Mauritius 2003 Karan Sharma (actor)
 Le Sens de la fête, English title: C'est la vie! (2017 film), a 2017 French film

Music

Albums
 C'est la Vie (Despina Vandi album), or the title song, 2010
 C'est la Vie (Henri Dikongué album), 1997
 C'est la vie (J. C. Schütz album), or the title song, 2009
 C'est la vie (Khaled album), or the title song (see below), 2012
 C'est la Vie (Martin Solveig album), or the title song (see below), 2008
 C'est La Vie (Phosphorescent album), 2018
 C'est la Vie (Polara album), 1997
 C'est La Vie (Rouge album), 2003
 C'est la Vie, by Alex Fox, 1997
 C'est la Vie, by B*Witched, or the title song (see below), 2006
 C'est la Vie, by Chyi Yu, 1999
 C'est la V, by Vanness Wu, 2011

Songs
 "C'est la Vie" (Alisa Mizuki song), 2005
 "C'est la Vie" (B*Witched song), 1998
 "C'est la vie" (Carson, Hanson and Malmkvist song), 2004
 "C'est la vie" (Khaled song), 2012
 "C'est la Vie" (Martin Solveig song), 2008
 "C'est la Vie" (Robbie Nevil song), 1986; originally recorded by Beau Williams (see below)
 "C'est la Vie" (Stereophonics song), 2015
 "C'est la Vie" (Always 21), by Ace of Base, 1999
 "(And Now the Waltz) C'est La Vie", by Slade, 1982
 "You Never Can Tell" (song), by Chuck Berry, also covered by Emmylou Harris as "C'est la Vie"
 "C'est la Vie", by Anna Puu, a contestant on the Finnish TV show Idols, 2009
 "C'est la Vie", by Ayaka Komatsu, as the fictional character Sailor Venus in the television series Pretty Guardian Sailor Moon, 2003
 "C'est la Vie", by Beau Williams, 1984
 "C'est la vie", by Bobby Bazini, 2016
 "C'est la vie", by Böhse Onkelz from Ein böses Märchen, 2000
 "C'est la vie", by Booba, 2012
 "C'est la vie", by Colonia, 2003
 "C'est la Vie", by Emerson, Lake & Palmer from Works Volume 1, 1977
 "C'est la vie", by Fish Leong from j'Adore, 2007
 "C'est la vie", by Gilli, 2015
 "C'est La Vie", by Gotthard from Bang!, 2014
 "C'est la vie!", by Hitomi Shimatani from Gate~scena III~, 2003
 "C'est la vie", by Hubert Kah, 1995
 "C'est la Vie", by Jean Michel Jarre from Métamorphoses, 2000
 "C'est la Vie", by Kim English from My Destiny, 2006
 "C'est la Vie", by L'Arc-en-Ciel from Heavenly, 1995
 "C'est La Vie", by La Toya Jackson from Startin' Over, 2002 (promo release)
 "C'est la Vie", by Lou Bega and Edvin Marton, 2006
 "C'est La Vie", by Magnum from Wings of Heaven, 1988
 "C'est la vie", by Marc Lavoine from Les Amours du dimanche, 1989
 "C'est La Vie", by Protest the Hero from Scurrilous, 2011
 "C'est la vie", by Shania Twain from Up!, 2002
 "C'est La Vie", by Tinashe from Nightride, 2016
 "C'est la vie", by Trix, 1981
 "C'est La Vie", by UB40 from Promises and Lies, 1993
 "C'est La Vie", by Vanessa Carlton from Harmonium, 2004
 "C'est La Vie", by Vitas, 2011
 "C'est La Vie", by Yngwie Malmsteen from Fire and Ice, 1992
 "C'est la Vie", an ABBA parody in the television series French and Saunders, 2005
 "C'est la Vie (Paryż z pocztówki)", by Andrzej Zaucha, 1987
 "C'est la Vie (Say The Casualties!)", by Neon Indian from Vega Intl. Night School, 2015
 "C'est La Vie (Simera)", by Despina Vandi from 10 Hronia Mazi, 2007

See also

 
 Shit Happens
 "Sing C'est la Vie", a song by Sonny & Cher from Look at Us
 C'est ça, la vie, German educational TV show
 Such Is Life (disambiguation)
 That's Life (disambiguation)
 La vie (disambiguation)
 Vie (disambiguation)